Felipe Vivancos Ruiz (born 16 June 1980 in Ibiza, Islas Baleares) is a Spanish hurdler. He won the gold medal at the 2005 Mediterranean Games in Almería, Spain.

Vivancos finished fifth at the 2002 IAAF World Cup and won the silver medal in 60 metres hurdles at the 2005 European Indoor Championships. He also competed at the World Championships in 2001 and 2005 as well as the 2004 Olympic Games without reaching the final round.

His personal best time is 13.41 seconds, achieved in July 2006 in Zaragoza. The Spanish record currently belongs to Jackson Quiñónez with 13.34 seconds.

Competition record

References

1980 births
Living people
Spanish male hurdlers
Athletes (track and field) at the 2004 Summer Olympics
Olympic athletes of Spain
Sportspeople from Ibiza
Mediterranean Games gold medalists for Spain
Athletes (track and field) at the 2005 Mediterranean Games
Mediterranean Games medalists in athletics